HMS Cherwell was a Palmer Type River-class destroyer ordered by the Royal Navy under the 1902 – 1903 Naval Estimates.  Named after the River Cherwell in south central England near Oxford, she was the first ship to carry this name in the Royal Navy.

Construction
She was laid down on 20 January 1903 at the Palmers shipyard at Jarrow and launched on 23 July 1903.  She was completed in March 1904.  Her original armament was to be the same as the Turleback torpedo boat destroyers that preceded her.  In 1906 the Admiralty decided to upgrade the armament by landing the five 6-pounder naval guns and shipping three 12-pounder 8 hundredweight (cwt) guns.  Two would be mounted abeam at the fo'c's'le break and the third gun would be mounted on the quarterdeck.

Pre-War
After commissioning she was assigned to the East Coast Destroyer Flotilla of the 1st Fleet and based at Harwich.

On 27 April 1908 the Eastern Flotilla departed Harwich for live fire and night manoeuvres.  During these exercises  rammed and sank , then damaged .

In April 1909 she was assigned to the 3rd Destroyer Flotilla on its formation at Harwich.  She remained until displaced by a Basilisk class destroyer by May 1912.  She was assigned to the 5th Destroyer Flotilla of the 2nd Fleet with a nucleus crew.

On 30 August 1912 the Admiralty directed all destroyer classes were to be designated by alpha characters starting with the letter 'A'.  The ships of the River class were assigned to the E class.  After 30 September 1913, she was known as an E class destroyer and had the letter 'E' painted on the hull below the bridge area and on either the fore or aft funnel.

World War I
The 9th Flotilla was a Patrol Flotilla tasked with anti-submarine and counter mining patrols in the Firth of Forth area. Her duties here included counter mining patrols and antisubmarine measures in defence of the Fleet anchorage.

In August 1915 with the amalgamation of the 7th and 9th Flotillas, she had been redeployed to the North Channel Patrol based at Larne, Northern Ireland.  Here she was employed in escorting merchant ships, anti-submarine patrols and counter smuggling patrols.

In November 1916, she was assigned to the 1st Destroyer Flotilla when it was redeployed to Portsmouth.  She was equipped with depth charges for employment in anti-submarine patrols, escorting of merchant ships and defending the Dover Barrage.  In the spring of 1917 as the convoy system was being introduced the 1st Flotilla was employed in convoy escort duties for the English Channel for the remainder of the war.

Disposition
In 1919 she was paid off and laid up in reserve awaiting disposal.  On 23 June 1919 she was sold to Thos. W. Ward of Sheffield for breaking at Rainham, Kent on the Thames Estuary.

She was not awarded a Battle Honour for her service.

Pennant Numbers

References

Bibliography
 
 
 
 
 
 
 

 

River-class destroyers
1903 ships